The Medicine Men is a 1938 American short Pre-Code comedy film directed by Norman Taurog.

External links

1929 short films
1929 comedy films
Films directed by Norman Taurog
1920s English-language films
American comedy films
American black-and-white films